Tryonia is a genus of ferns in the subfamily Pteridoideae of the family Pteridaceae. Species are native to the east of Brazil and to Uruguay.

The genus was circumscribed by Eric Schuettpelz, Jefferson Prado and Alyssa T. Cochran in PhytoKeys vol.35 on page 35 in 2014.

The genus name of Tryonia is in honour of Alice F. Tryon (1920–2009), who was an American botanist (mainly pteridology). She examined the taxonomy of the fern genera Jamesonia.

Species
, the Checklist of Ferns and Lycophytes of the World recognized the following species:
Tryonia areniticola (Schwartsb. & Labiak) Schuettp., J.Prado & A.T.Cochran
Tryonia macrophylla A.Rojas
Tryonia myriophylla (Sw.) Schuettp., J.Prado & A.T.Cochran
Tryonia schwackeana (Christ) Schuettp., J.Prado & A.T.Cochran
Tryonia sellowiana (Mett.) Schuettp., J.Prado & A.T.Cochran

References

Pteridaceae
Fern genera